CIPU-FM is a First Nations community radio station which  broadcast at 97.1 MHz (FM) in Sipekne'katik, Nova Scotia, Canada.

History
On December 8, 2011, the Canadian Radio-television and Telecommunications Commission (CRTC) approved Shubie FM Radio's application to operate a new an English and Mi'kmaq, low-power Type B Native FM radio station. Shubie FM is a volunteer-run community radio station. It operates out of Sipekne'katik (Indian Brook) Reservation (Micmac).

References

External links
 

IPU
Radio stations established in 2011
2011 establishments in Nova Scotia